Susanna is a 2000 Malayalam film written, directed and produced by T. V. Chandran with Vani Viswanath in the title role. The film won two Kerala State Film Awards: Second Best Actress (Vani Viswanath) and Special Jury Mention (T. V. Chandran). It received the Padmarajan Award for Cinema in 2000. Susanna is widely regarded as the best performance by Vani Viswanath.

Plot
The central character is Susanna, who appears to be a prostitute living with five different people at the same time. These five men and Susanna engage in a strange relationship, easily misunderstood by the society around them.  But no one can judge her on grounds of morality. She is a mother, wife, sister, daughter to all her men. They find peace in her presence.

Cast

Vani Viswanath as Susanna
Narendra Prasad as Prof. Noor Mohammad
Charuhasan as 	Ramakrishna Iyer
Bharath Gopi as Retd. High Commissioner K. P. Govardhanan Pillai
Madhupal as Ramesan
Mukundan as Thomachan
M. R. Gopakumar
M.G. Sasi
Shivaji
Nedumudi Venu as Colonel Ramachandran Nair
Urmila Unni as Bhargavi
K. B. Ganesh Kumar
Murali as Josekutty
MG Sasi
Mukundan Menon
Gopalakrishnan
Prasanna Ravi
Teena
KG Chitranjali
Remya
Sudhiranjan
Aliyar
Reshmi Soman as Susanna's daughter
Omana Ouseph
Geetha Nair as Ramakrishna Iyer's wife

Soundtrack
The music is composed by Johnson. Canadian poet and musician Leonard Cohen's "Suzanne" is played in the film.
"English Song" - N/A
"Himabinduvai Pirannu Ninmel" - Johnson

Production
Mallika Sarabhai was also approached to play the role of Susanna.

Reception 
D. Jose of ''Rediff wrote, "Where this film — obviously produced on the thinnest of shoestrings — works is in the fact that, even as it tries to portray a power-packed woman as the central character, it does so without feminist ranting or the usual tears and pathos as Susanna stumbles from misery to misfortune."

References

External links
 

2000s Malayalam-language films
Films directed by T. V. Chandran
Films scored by Johnson